Gangsta Walking (often referred to as:  G-Walk , Buckin, Tickin, Jookin, or Choppin) is a street dance that originated in African-American communities in Memphis, Tennessee alongside "Buck" music during the 1990s. The Gangsta Walk is commonly performed to crunk music due to the particular 'bounce' in the beat and the movement the dancers make to keep with it. Though Gangsta Walking has been around for many years, much of the dance is still exclusive to the city and surrounding areas.

Gangsta Walk was created in Memphis. Originated by the group G-Style who released the first Gangsta Walk video ever titled “G-Style Gangsta" that consisted of Romeo, Wolf, and Hurricane, who went on to land a production deal with Dallas Austin behind the groups Boyz II Men, Monica, Another Bad Creation and TLC to name a few. They went on to land a major record deal with P. Diddy's Bad Boy entertainment and the first group to launch Bad Boy South. From the group success and their early video release from the song G-Style ”Gangsta". Doors opened and gave opportunity for other dances in Memphis Tennessee such as Jookin, Buckin, etc. and have spread abroad. The group continues to be a major part on the Memphis music scene with Romeo's latest business venture Romeo Franklin Productions that focus on training dancers, choreography and video and music productions. This unsung group as quiet as kept has been one of the major forces in getting Memphis music on the map.

Development
Due to video streaming websites like YouTube and social networks like myspace.com and others, "gangsta walking", "jookin", "choppin", "buckin" or whatever it may be called, has spread in popularity. In 2007, Memphis rapper–director–producer Young Jai, of Jai Productions / Black Star Enterprisers, released Memphis Jookin Vol 1 DVD.  This DVD featured the new generation of jookers/Gangsta Walkers. It featured such Jookers as G-Nerd, Mike Doss, Chopper king, Lil Daniel, Dr. Rico, Brandon  Lil Buck, Lil Black, Bobo, female Jooker/Singer LaShuante Anderson, Underground King Keviorr, DJ Sidewalker, North Memphis Legend Lil Jayson and many others. This DVD helped springboard the Jookin/Gangsta Walking movement. In November 2007, Jookin was featured on Channel 3 WREG-TV news in Memphis and also on Channel 5 WMC-TV. There are several videos on Jookin on memphisjookin.com  and Youtube.com, with some videos receiving millions of views. Jai Productions and The Memphis Jookin community was also featured in the December 2007 issue of the French magazine Juste Debout as the Dance of the Month. Jai productions also released a solo Jookin DVD on G-Nerd entitled "Truth Be Told" and Tutorial entitled "Memphis Jookin wit G-Nerd". Jai Productions has also released the entire Memphis Jookin Vol 2. 3-part series, which showcases more of the Jookin community that is involved in the movement to help get this dance on the map. Nowadays our youth have somewhere to go and learn the Memphis style. Memphian Tarrik Moore And Marico Flake (Dr Rico) originally opened U-Dig Jookin Academy in the once Raleigh Springs Mall, but have since renamed to Memphis Jookin Urban Ballet after the mall was closed.

Perception of Gangsta Walking
Along with being a popular street dance, the Gangsta Walk is often viewed as a form of self-expression and relief from the hardships of living within the inner city. Some have even considered Gangsta Walking as being a less extreme kin of Krumping due to it steering many of the youth away from street violence and exacting their energy into something positive and constructive. The dance can commonly be found in urban areas of Memphis like North Memphis, South Memphis, Orange Mound, Whitehaven, West Memphis  etc.

Types of Gangsta Walk
There are variations of styles for the Gangsta Walk:

 One particular style requires the dancer to take (in a jerking motion) quick steps, stomp, twists and throwing their arms around all while moving to a beat, the best example being Crunchy Black's style, referred to as G-Walking. The style is considered the basis of all Gangsta Walking done in Memphis since the 1980s.
 Another style requires three or more people hopping around in a circle in a rhythmic motion, while throwing their hands into the air and yelling "Get Buck" or the lyrics to a Buck song. This style of the Gangsta Walk is more commonly referred to as the G-Train. It is said that this style was banned from the clubs shortly after being created due to the wildness it invoked in performers as well as onlookers. Reminders of its existence are still left behind in older clubs or closed down night spots around the city.
 The most known style of Gangsta Walking is within the standard crunk atmosphere, involving a crowd of people slamming and pushing off one another on the dance floor.
 The most famous and practiced style of Gangsta Walking around the city takes bits and pieces from other street dance styles like liquid dancing (the wave, tutting, tracing, contours and hand flowing), the robot, locking, popping, gliding and even breakdancing all merged with the traditional dance. The most recognizable moves in the dance are moves similar to the two-step between making another motion and spinning or walking on the tips of their toes. This style of the Gangsta Walk is mostly done by the younger generation and the generation behind them who grew up shortly after the invention of Buck music, thus titling it Buckin.
 Jookin took the classic steps and combined a much smoother look caused by the music change in Memphis Music during the early 1990s. Jookin is most noted for not only its smooth steps, but its heavy introduction of pantomiming into the dance styles. Jookin emphasized footwork in a way that focused the crowds attention on the feet. Jookin is especially characterized by the dancers' abilities in sliding and stepping movements.
 Buckin brought in the exaggerated movements of Gangsta Walking and Jookin.  The movements were made to appear more expansive due to the buckness (exaggerated style) of the dancer –  the most explosive style of Gangsta Walking. Buckers began to lift the slide (of the feet) off the ground, creating even higher glides than ever seen before.
 Choppin' came in the mid 1990s as dancers in Memphis started to add the animated effect of Gangsta Walking, Jookin, and Buckin to the dance floor.  Choppin' consisted of stiffening the muscles until they began to vibrate and then moving while trying to create a very unreal stiff Gangsta Walk.
 Icin', the newest form of Gansta Walking, is most known for the ability to slide with one foot while gliding with the other. Icers give the illusions of ice skating through the explosiveness of the movements they applied while gliding across the floor. Some nickname it "Blazing." Icin' also included different ways of freezing the body parts while carrying oneself around the floor.
 Basics of all the styles include stepping, pacmans, and buck jumps.

Music videos 
 Al Kapone - "Buckin' and Jookin
 Three 6 Mafia feat.Chamillionaire - "Doe Boy Fresh"
 Three 6 Mafia feat. Bow Wow & Project Pat - "Side 2 Side (remix)"
 Three 6 Mafia feat. Lil' Flip - "Ridin' Spinners"
 Project Pat - "Raised in the Projects"
 Da Volunteers feat.MJG - "Favorite Color"
 Huey feat T-Pain -"G5"
 Janelle Monáe feat. Big Boi - "Tightrope" (2010) 
Flume & Chet Faker - "Drop the Game" (2013)

See also
 Crip Walk
 Gangs in Memphis, Tennessee

References

External links
 Official Memphis Jookin Site

Hip hop dance
Culture of Memphis, Tennessee
Street dance